The Rasova is a left tributary of the river Jaleș in Romania. It flows into the Jaleș near Tămășești.

References

Rivers of Romania
Rivers of Gorj County